Intrawest Resorts Holdings, Inc was a developer and operator of destination resorts and a luxury adventure travel company.  The company was founded in 1976 as a privately funded real estate development company.  In 2006, Intrawest was purchased by Fortress Investment Group, a private equity investment company, which resulted in the company being delisted from the Toronto Stock Exchange and New York Stock Exchange. Fortress was under financial pressure related to the Intrawest debt, but a new loan with a single lender was completed in April 2010 and all prior lenders were repaid in full.

In recent years, Intrawest has strengthened its cash flows, despite 2012 proving to be a challenging year for the American ski industry with warmer than normal temperatures and snowfall at 50% of historical averages. Western Canada experienced above average and record snowfall amounts in some areas.

In May 2017, it was announced that Intrawest would no longer exist as public company after its acquisition by Henry Crown and Company and KSL Capital Partners. Intrawest resorts are now operated by Alterra Mountain Company, which announced its new name at the 2018 Outdoor Retailer show in Denver, Colorado.

History

In 1986, Intrawest acquired Blackcomb Mountain from the Federal Business Development Bank, a Canadian Crown Corporation, and Fortress Mountain of Alberta (no relation to Fortress Investments LLC), a wholly owned division of Aspen Skiing Company. The company later went public, listed on the Toronto and New York Stock Exchanges and, in 1996, merged with Whistler Mountain Ski Corporation to form Whistler-Blackcomb resort, a venue of the 2010 Winter Olympics and Paralympic Games.  Intrawest eventually spun off Whistler-Blackcomb and sold the last of its shares in that company in 2012.

Today, the Intrawest network includes mountain resorts. Intrawest also operates Club Intrawest, a private resort club with nine locations in North America.  The company is the largest developer and operator of resort properties in North America offering skiing, snowboarding, golf, mountain biking, lodging, and real estate opportunities at each of its resorts.  Intrawest develops real estate at its resorts and at other locations across North America.  The company owns Canadian Mountain Holidays, the largest heli-skiing operation in the world.

On November 12, 2013, Intrawest filed an initial public offering (IPO) with the New York Stock Exchange to raise up to $100 Million.  The filing states that the money is being raised, "for working capital and other general corporate purposes, which may include potential investments in, and acquisitions of, ski and adventure travel businesses and assets."

In 2016, Intrawest initiated significant reductions in full time staff to achieve rapid cost reductions. Numerous key staff positions have been eliminated at its corporate headquarters and resort locations. This follows the sale of the Club Intrawest time share lodging operation to Diamond Resorts International at the end of 2015. It is unclear regarding the company's longer term strategies as it continues to display inconsistent approaches in its business and staffing model. In 2017, Intrawest was sold to Henry Crown and Company (which owns Aspen Skiing Company) and KSL Capital Partners for $1.5 billion. 
In May 2017, it was announced that Intrawest would no longer exist as public company. The newly formed company is called Alterra Mountain Company, which was announced at the 2018 Outdoor Retailer Show in Denver, Colorado.

Latest resorts
Resorts owned at least in part by Intrawest included:
Blue Mountain, Ontario
Snowshoe Mountain, West Virginia
Steamboat Ski Resort, Colorado
Stratton Mountain Resort, Vermont
Mont Tremblant Resort, Quebec
Canadian Mountain Holidays, Alberta 
Winter Park, Colorado (Intrawest is contracted to operate this city park which is owned by the City of Denver.)
Zihuatanejo, Mexico
Deer Valley Resort, Utah

Former resorts
 Mont Ste. Marie, Québec (February 2002)
 Mammoth, California (October 2005)
 Whistler Blackcomb, British Columbia
 Copper Mountain, Colorado (November 2009)
 Les Arcs 1950, France (October 2009)
 Flaine Montsoleil development, France (October 2009)
 Panorama Mountain Village, British Columbia (January 2010)
 Mountain Creek, New Jersey (May 2010)
 Sandestin Golf & Beach Resort, Florida (March 2010)
 The Village at Squaw Valley, California (January 2010)

References

External links
Intrawest
Club Intrawest
Canadian Mountain Holidays

Hospitality companies established in 1976
Companies based in Vancouver
Companies formerly listed on the New York Stock Exchange
Private equity portfolio companies
Amusement park companies
1976 establishments in British Columbia
Hospitality companies disestablished in 2017
2017 disestablishments in British Columbia